Enur (also known as Artificial Funk) was a Danish electronic music duo.

Career
Artificial Funk was initially an alias of Rune Reilly Kölsch in the 1990s; in 2000, he joined forces with half brother Johannes Torpe to form the duo. They initially achieved some notoriety by being signed to Skint Records in 2002. In 2003, Artificial Funk released the track "Together", written by Kölsch and Nellie Ettison which was nominated for the Top 10 Tracks of the Year by DJ Mag. It reached No. 67 on the Dutch Singles Chart.

Rune and Torpe have also founded the labels ArtiFarti Records (2005), Tattoorec.com (2006) and Nightology Records (2008). In addition, Torpe runs a design company through Johannes Torpe studios in addition to Toolroom Records.

Together they have won five DJ awards plus a Danish Grammy Award.

As Enur
In 2007, Rune and Torpe, under the name Enur, scored a major club hit in 2007 with a new version of "Calabria" titled "Calabria 2007" featuring reggae vocalist and fellow Dane Natasja Saad. "Calabria 2007" peaked at No. 9 in France, as well becoming a hit in Belgium, Canada and Portugal. It crossed to American shores via New York dance label Ultra Records and charted on the Billboard Hot 100, gaining support from mainstream and rhythmic top 40, dance and Latin radio. It also went to No. 29 on the European Hot 100 singles chart. The song was eventually remixed again for their album, Raggatronic in 2008. The song also appeared in a commercial for Target.

Enur released Raggatronic on September 9, 2008, featuring guest artists such as Nicki Minaj, Beenie Man, Natasja Saad, Greg Nice, Majid, Natalie Storm and Chopper City Boyz. According to Billboard, the Caribbean, soul and electronic influences featured in "Calabria" are prominently featured on the album.

While discussing Raggatronic, Rune said: "I think America needs something fresh like that, and then also a lot of people – just the sound is such a mixture of influences. I think it appeals to a lot of different characters, and I think that's an advantage of coming from Europe and not having to pigeonhole into some sort of genre."

Discography

Albums
2008: Sleep Less, Live More

Singles
1995: "Real Funk"
1996: "Zone One"
2000: "Use It (The Music)"
2001: "People Don't Know"
2002: "I Can't Help Myself"
2002: "Together" (with Nellie Ettison)
2005: "Never Alone"

As Enur
Album
2008: Raggatronic

Singles
2007: "Calabria 2007"
2012: "I'm That Chick" (featuring Nicki Minaj & Goonrock)

References

External links

 Enur's Myspace

Musical groups established in 2000
Danish dance music groups
Danish musical duos
Danish record producers
Danish songwriters
Male musical duos
Sibling musical duos
Record production duos
Electronic dance music duos